Dennis van der Geest (born 27 June 1975) is a Dutch judoka, who won the bronze medal in the men's heavyweight (+ 100 kg) division at the 2004 Summer Olympics. He was born in Haarlem, North Holland.

In 2005, he became the world judo champion in the men's open division by defeating Russian Tamerlan Tmenov with ippon in the final. In 2000 and 2002, he became European Champion in the over 100 kg event. He won three bronze medals and one silver medal at previous world championships.

At the 2008 Summer Olympics, Van der Geest was eliminated in the first round by Tamerlan Tmenov. He sustained a minor fracture during the match when Tmenov fell on his arm, but he was able to finish the fight. Van der Geest planned to finish his Judo career after the 2008 Summer Olympics to pursue a career in the music industry, but after his unexpected defeat, he was quoted as considering entering the World Championship in 2009. However, on 7 May 2009 Dennis van der Geest announced his retirement from top sport, owing to his lack of motivation.

Outside his sport he was the ambassador of his favourite football team Feyenoord Rotterdam in the 2005/06 season. Next to that, he released his first single, "To The Sunshine", on 8 August 2008. This track was released under his stage name of Ippon, and is a collaboration with producer Ronald Molendijk.

His younger brother Elco is also a judoka competing at the highest level.

In 2011 and 2013 he appeared in episodes of the television game show De Jongens tegen de Meisjes.

In 2019 he played a role in the film Brugklas: De tijd van m'n leven.

External links

  
 
 
 Videos of Dennis van der Geest on Judovision.org

1975 births
Living people
Dutch male judoka
Judoka at the 2000 Summer Olympics
Judoka at the 2004 Summer Olympics
Judoka at the 2008 Summer Olympics
Medalists at the 2004 Summer Olympics
Olympic bronze medalists for the Netherlands
Olympic judoka of the Netherlands
Olympic medalists in judo
Sportspeople from Haarlem
World judo champions
Universiade medalists in judo
Universiade silver medalists for the Netherlands
Medalists at the 1999 Summer Universiade
20th-century Dutch people
21st-century Dutch people